Lost Horse Fireman's Cabin, in the vicinity of Darby, Montana, was built in 1938.  It was listed on the National Register of Historic Places in 1989.

It a log cabin which was built by the U.S. Forest Service.

"The design of the cabin was from a standard Region 1 plan, except for the drive through porch, developed by Clyde Fickes."

References

Log cabins in the United States
National Register of Historic Places in Ravalli County, Montana
Residential buildings completed in 1938
Log buildings and structures on the National Register of Historic Places in Montana
Firefighting in Montana
United States Forest Service firefighting
1938 establishments in Montana